The Sapieha Palace in Lviv, Ukraine is a Chateauesque two-storey mansion dating from the 1870s. It is lightly screened from the road by a wrought-iron grill. The house's first owner was Prince Adam Sapieha, a pioneer of railway building in Galicia. 

After the September Campaign, the palace was taken over by the Soviet state and housed a school until a restoration campaign was launched in the 1990s. At present it is home to a regional society for preservation of historical and architectural monuments.

See also 
 Potocki Palace in Lviv

References
 Памятники градостроительства и архитектуры Украинской ССР. Киев: Будивельник, 1983–1986. Том 3, с. 14.

Houses completed in the 19th century
Palaces in Ukraine
Buildings and structures in Lviv
Beaux-Arts architecture
Sapieha